Nanying may refer to:

 Nanying, Gaocheng District, a town in Gaocheng District, Shijiazhuang, Hebei, China
 Nanying Township, a township in Lingshou County, Shijiazhuang, Hebei, China
 Nanying Subdistrict (南营街道), a subdistrict of Yicheng, Hubei, China

See also
Nanyin (disambiguation)